A Bachelor in Organizational Psychology (also referred to as Industrial Psychology) is a type of postgraduate academic bachelor's degree awarded by universities in many countries. This degree is typically studied for in industrial and organizational psychology.

Curriculum structure
A Bachelor of Arts or Science in Organizational Psychology is a four-year bachelor's degree, depending on the program, organizational psychology may be offered as a concentration to a traditional bachelor's degree in psychology.

Topics of study may include:
 Behavioral risk management
 Commitment
 Decision making
 Diversity
 Educational psychology
 Employment law
 Ethics
 Executive coaching
 Human factors
 Human resources
 Industrial sociology
 Job attitudes
 Job design
 job satisfaction
 Leadership
 Occupational health and safety
 Occupational health psychology
 Organizational citizenship behavior
 Organizational culture
 Organizational development
 Organizational Research Methods
 Organizational socialization
 Person-environment fit
 Personnel psychology
 Personnel recruitment and selection
 Performance appraisal
 Psychometrics
 Quality of working life
 Systems psychology
 Team composition
 Work motivation

Institutions with organizational psychology degree programs
Institutions in the United States that have a Bachelor's in Organizational Psychology Degree Program include:
 Barry University
 DePaul University
 Florida Institute of Technology

See also
 Applied psychology
 American Psychological Association
 Association of Business Psychologists
 List of tagged degrees
 Outline of psychology
 Society for Industrial and Organizational Psychology (SIOP)

References

Arts in Organizational Psychology
Psychology education